The 1899 Holy Cross football team was an American football team that represented the College of the Holy Cross as an independent in the 1899 college football season.

In their second year under head coach Maurice Connor, the team compiled a 5–5 record. John Kenney was the team captain.

Holy Cross played its home games at two off-campus fields in Worcester, Massachusetts, the Worcester Oval and the Worcester College Grounds.

Schedule

References

Holy Cross
Holy Cross Crusaders football seasons
Holy Cross football